Guns of the Law is a 1944 American Western film written and directed by Elmer Clifton. The film stars Dave O'Brien, James Newill and Guy Wilkerson, with Jennifer Holt, Budd Buster and Charles King. The film was released on 31 March 1944, by Producers Releasing Corporation.

Cast
Dave O'Brien as Tex Wyatt
James Newill as Jim Steele
Guy Wilkerson as Panhandle Perkins
Jennifer Holt as Lillian Wilkins
Budd Buster as Jed Wilkins
Charles King as Kendall Lowther
Jack Ingram as Surveyor Sam Brisco
Bob Kortman as Joe Hyslop
Robert Barron as Henchman Dan Tyndall
Frank McCarroll as Henchman Tom Binns

Bud Osborne, Slim Whitaker and Dan White appear uncredited.

See also
The Texas Rangers series:
 The Rangers Take Over (1942)
 Bad Men of Thunder Gap (1943)
 West of Texas (1943)
 Border Buckaroos (1943)
 Fighting Valley (1943)
 Trail of Terror (1943)
 The Return of the Rangers (1943)
 Boss of Rawhide (1943)
 Outlaw Roundup (1944)
 Guns of the Law (1944)
 The Pinto Bandit (1944)
 Spook Town (1944)
 Brand of the Devil (1944)
 Gunsmoke Mesa (1944)
 Gangsters of the Frontier (1944)
 Dead or Alive (1944)
 The Whispering Skull (1944)
 Marked for Murder (1945)
 Enemy of the Law (1945)
 Three in the Saddle (1945)
 Frontier Fugitives (1945)
 Flaming Bullets (1945)

References

External links

1944 films
1944 Western (genre) films
1940s English-language films
Films directed by Elmer Clifton
American black-and-white films
Producers Releasing Corporation films
American Western (genre) films
1940s American films